The M Countdown Chart is a record chart on the South Korean Mnet television music program M Countdown. Every week, the show awards the best-performing single on the chart in the country during its live broadcast.

In 2022, 31 singles have achieved number one on the chart, and 26 acts have been awarded first-place trophies. "Yet to Come" by BTS had the highest score of the year, with 11,000 points on the June 23 broadcast. Four songs collected trophies for three weeks and achieved a Triple Crown: Big Bang's "Still Life", BTS' "Yet to Come", and Blackpink's "Pink Venom" and "Shut Down".

Scoring system

Chart history

References 

2022 in South Korean music
2022 record charts
Lists of number-one songs in South Korea